Amleto Frignani (5 March 1932 in – 2 March 1997) was an Italian footballer who played as a striker.

Club career
Frignani played 9 seasons (248 games, 40 goals) in the Italian Serie A for A.C. Milan, Udinese Calcio and Genoa C.F.C.

International career
At international level, Frignani earned 14 caps and scored 6 goals for the Italian national team between 1952 and 1957, and participated in the 1954 FIFA World Cup.

Honours
Milan
 Serie A champion: 1954–55.

1932 births
1997 deaths
Italian footballers
Italy international footballers
Sportspeople from Carpi, Emilia-Romagna
1954 FIFA World Cup players
A.C. Reggiana 1919 players
A.C. Milan players
Udinese Calcio players
Genoa C.F.C. players
Serie A players
Serie B players
Association football forwards
Footballers from Emilia-Romagna